Karl Meltzer (born December 8, 1967, nicknamed "Speedgoat Karl") is an ultrarunner and ultrarunning coach based in Sandy, Utah.  Meltzer has won more 100-mile ultramarathons than any other ultramarathoner, and has held speed records at major U.S. trails, including the Appalachian Trail and the Pony Express Trail. Meltzer's trail runs have been featured in news outlets from Ultrarunning.com to NBC Sports.
Meltzer has been a professional ultramarathoner since 1999, and a coach since 2007.

While many ultramarathoners tend to be vegetarian, vegan, and anti-alcohol or caffeine, Meltzer has been seen with bacon, Red Bull, and microbrews.

On September 18, 2016, Meltzer set an Appalachian Trail record by completing the 2,190 miles over 14 states in 45 days 22 hours and 38 minutes. This achievement was featured in a 2017 documentary movie "Made To Be Broken". Meltzer's record was eclipsed in September 2017 by Joe McConaughy in a self-supported run. The current A.T. fastest known time was by Belgian runner Karel Sabbe, who completed the trail in 41 days, 7 hours, and 39 minutes on August 29, 2018.

Meltzer is the current Race Director for the Speedgoat 50K at Snowbird Ski Resort.

Ultramarathon wins
 All-time winner at the Wasatch 100 (6 times)
 Hardrock 100 (5 times)
 San Diego 100 (3 times)
 Squaw Peak 50 (5 times)
 Bighorn 100 (2 times)
 Bear 100 (3 times)
 Massanutten 100 (4 times)
 Coyote Two Moon 100 (2 times)
 Moab Red Hot 50k (2 times)
 Zane Grey Highline Trail 50 Mile Run
Devil Dog 100
 No Business 100 (2020)

As of December 11, 2021, Meltzer had won at the 100 mile-distance 45 times, the all-time record.  As of March 7, 2010, he had 53 ultra wins in 105 starts.
 
 Most 100-mile wins during a calendar year with six in 2006, four of them record performances, the final four in a period of eight weeks.  Five wins in 2007, 2009, and four in 2005 (previous record held by Eric Clifton, with four 100-mile wins in 1991; Joe Hildebrand also won four 100s in 1999).  Meltzer has four times won at least four 100s in a calendar year.
 USATF, Ultrarunning Magazine, RRCA Runner of the Year 2006, Everest Award 2006
 2nd place Ultrarunning Magazine Ultrarunner of the Year 2007, 2009
 Maine to Georgia 2008, 2176 miles, 500,000′ vertical climbing, in 54 days, 21 hours, 12 minutes, the 4th fastest Appalachian Trail thru-hike. Meltzer stayed up to date with his fans and followers with a catchy "Where's Karl?" campaign.
 Speed Record for running the Pony Express Trail from Sacramento, California to St. Joseph, Missouri
 On September 18, 2016, Meltzer set an Appalachian Trail record by completing the 2,190 miles over 14 states in 45 days 22 hours and 38 minutes.
 On October 17, 2020, Meltzer won the 2020 No Business 100 Mile Race to add to his streak of 19 consecutive years winning a 100 mile race.

Notable Race Results

1998 

 Wasatch 100, September 5 - 1st, 20:08:00

1999 

 Leona Divide 50 miler, April 17 - 1st, 7:04:25 
 Squaw Peak 50 miler, June 5 - 1st, 8:07:29 
 Wasatch 100, September 11 - 2nd, 21:49:00

2000 

 Crown King Scramble 50 miler, March 18 - 2nd, 7:54:17
 Wasatch 100, September 9 - 1st, 20:52:56 
 Baldy Peaks 50k, October 21 - 1st, 5:39:41

2001 

 Phoenix National Trail 50 Mile Endurance Run, January 6 - 3rd, 7:49:12 
 Hagg Mudd 50k, February 17 - 2nd, 3:50:12 
 Crown King Scramble 50k, March 17 - 1st, 4:17:53 
 Zane Grey Highline Trail 50 miler, April 28 - 2nd, 8:51:30 
 Squaw Peak 50 Mile Trail Run, June 2 - 1st, 7:49:25 
 Hardrock 100 Endurance Run, July 13 - 1st, 26:39:00

2002 

 Red Rock Fat Ass 50k, January 5 - 2nd, 4:37:00
 Zane Grey Highline Trail 50 miler, April 27 - 1st, 8:07:00 
 Squaw Peak 50 Mile Trail Run, June 1 - 1st, 7:35:58 
 Wasatch 100, September 7 - 2nd, 20:54:18

2003 

 Squaw Peak 50 Mile Trail Run, June 7 - 1st, 7:45:57 
 Hardrock 100 Endurance Run, July 11 - 1st, 28:01:55 
 Wasatch 100, September 6 - 1st, 20:46:35 
 The Bear 100 miler, September 26 - 2nd, 20:20:11

2004 

 Squaw Peak 50 Mile Trail Run, June 5 - 1st, 7:57:01 
 Silverton Alpine Marathon, August 28 - 1st, 3:39:00 
 Wasatch 100, September 11 - 1st, 20:06:08 
 Vermont 50 Miler, September 25 - 1st, 6:59:17

2005 

 Old Pueblo Endurance Run 50 Miler, March 5 - 1st, 7:10:34 
 Silver State 50 Miler, May 21 - 1st, 7:35:59 
 Hardrock 100 Endurance Run, July 8 - 1st, 28:29:15 
 Wasatch 100, September 10 - 1st, 19:43:47 
 The Bear 100 miler, September 23 - 1st, 20:01:35 
 San Diego 100, October 23 - 1st, 17:24:15

2006 

 HURT 100, January 14 - 1st, 22:16:00 
 Massanutten Mountain Trails 100, May 13 - 2nd, 17:58:42 
 Squaw Peak 50 Mile Trail Run, June 3 - 2nd, 8:08:13 
 Hardrock 100 Endurance Run, July 14 - 1st, 27:07:55 
 Wasatch 100, September 9 - 1st, 20:18:58 
 The Bear 100 miler, September 22 - 1st, 18:35:00 
 San Diego 100, October 21 - 1st, 15:48:00 
 Javelina Jundred, November 4 - 1st, 15:25:10

2007 

 HURT 100, January 13 - 1st, 12:37:00 
 Moab Red Hot 55k, February 17 - 1st, 4:25:00 
 McNaughton Park 100, April 14 - 1st, 17:40:13 
 Massanutten Mountain Trails 100, May 19 - 1st, 20:11:09 
 The Bighorn Mountain Wild and Scenic Trail Run 100 miler, June 15 - 1st, 20:12:58 
 Hardrock 100 Endurance Run, July 13 - 2nd, 28:59:08 
 The Bear 100 miler, September 28 - 1st, 18:50:45 
 San Diego 100, October 20 - 1st, 17:45:50

2008 

 Coyote Two Moon 100 miler, March 21 - 1st, 17:24:00 
 Jemez Mountain 50 miler, May 17 - 2nd, 8:58:03

2009 

 Moab 34 mile, Feb 14  (finished 3rd, PR by 13 minutes, great run) 4:13
 Way Too Cool 50k, March 14  (finished 20th, minor calf injury at 25) 4:08
 Massanutten 100, May 16  (finished 1st, 17 minutes off CR)  Won by 2+ hours.  18:29
 Pocatello 50 mile relay-3 runners May 23.  Won the first leg overall 17 miles-2:23
 Bighorn 100, June 19  (finished 1st in 19:13 with a Course Record) Won by 2+ hours
 Hardrock 100, July 10  (finished 1st in 24:38.  Counter-clockwise record, 5th Hardrock win.  Won by 1.5 hours)
 Jupiter Peak Steeplechase 16 mile, August 8 (20th place)
 Wasatch 100, September 11 (Finished 2nd, but under previous CR, 19:12)
 Grindstone 100, October 2  (Finished 1st, course record by about 2 hours) 18:46
 Pinhoti 100, November 7  (Finished 1st, course record by over 2 hours)  17:12

2010 

 Moab 55k, February 13 - 1st, 4:19:09 
 Coyote Two Moon 100 miler, March 5 - 1st, 21:02:00

2011 

 Antelope Island Buffalo Run 100 Miler, March 25 - 2nd, 16:06:50 
 Massanutten Mountain Trails 100 Miler, May 14 - 1st, 18:18:25 
 Wasatch 100, September 9 - 3rd, 20:59:53 
 Pinhoti 100 Miler, November 5 - 1st, 16:42:20

2012 

 Rocky Raccoon 100 Miler, February 4 - 2nd, 14:17:42
 Moab Red Hot 55k, February 18 - 3rd, 4:19:43 
 Antelope Island Buffalo Run 100 Miler, March 23 - 1st, 15:28:15 
 Zane Grey Highline Trail 50 Miler, April 21 - 3rd, 9:25:30 
 Pocatello 50 Miler, June 2 - 2nd, 8:42:07 
 Run Rabbit Run 100 Miler, September 15 - 1st, 19:16:02 
 Grindstone 100 Miler, October 5 - 1st, 17:13:04
 Chimera 100 Miler and Old Goat Races, November 17 - 2nd, 17:30:13

2013 

 Antelope Island Buffalo Run 100 Miler, March 22 - 1st, 14:34:00 
 Run Rabbit Run 100 Miler, September 13 - 2nd, 18:32:07  
 The Bear 100 Miler, September 27 - 2nd, 19:39:20 
 WC-50 Ultra Trail Marathon 50 Miler, October 19 - 1st, 8:24:26

2014 

 Zion Ultra Marathon 100k, April 6 - 1st, 9:09:40 
 Massanutten Mountain Trails 100 Miler, May 17 - 1st, 18:40:23

2015 

 Cruel Jewel 100 Miler, May 15 - 1st, 24:16:29

2016 

 Lake Martin 100 Miler, March 19 - 1st, 16:56:57

2017 

 Zane Grey Highline Trail 100k, April 29 - 1st, 9:32:38 
 WC-50 Ultra Trail Marathon 50k, October 14 - 1st, 5:08:48 
 Pinhoti 100 Miler, November 4 - 1st, 18:18:27

2018 

 Lone Star 100 Miler, February 10 - 1st, 23:38:18 
 Hellbender 100 Miler, April 20 - 1st, 21:56:00

2019 

 Lone Star 100 Miler, February 9 - 2nd, 23:23:42 
 Ute 100 Miler, August 9–10 - 3rd, 24:12:57
 Cloudsplitter 100 Miler, October 12–13 - 1st, 21:16:24
 Devil Dog 100 Miler, December 7–8 – 1st, 19:21:07

2020 

 No Business 100 Miler, October 16–17 - 1st, 19:44:41

2021 

 Beast of the East 100 Miler, December 11 - 1st, 21:42:13

References

External links

1967 births
Living people
American male ultramarathon runners
American male steeplechase runners